Archduchess Maria Elisabeth of Austria (13 December 1680 in Linz – 26 August 1741 in Mariemont, Morlanwelz), was the governor of the Habsburg Netherlands between 1725 and 1741.

Life
Maria Elisabeth was a daughter of Emperor Leopold I and Eleonore-Magdalena of Pfalz-Neuburg. She was well educated and fluent in Latin, German, French and Italian.
She never married.

Governor
In 1725, she was appointed Prince Eugene of Savoy's successor as the regent governor of the Austrian Netherlands by her brother, Charles VI.

Maria Elisabeth was described as a forceful administrator and a popular regent. Her independent politics, however, were not always appreciated in Vienna. She suspended the Ostend Company in 1727 and closed it in 1731.

She had enough financial means at her disposal to uphold an elaborate court which stimulated culture and music. Among others, she patronized Jean-Joseph Fiocco, her maestro di cappella who dedicated several oratorios to her between 1726 and 1738.

The architect Jean-Andre Anneessens designed the palace Mariemont for her, where she spent her summers.

Death
She died unexpectedly at Mariemont, upon which she was displayed at a public Lit-de-parade in Brussels 29 August. When she died at the age of 61, she was first buried in Brussels, but moved to Vienna in 1749, where she lies now in the Imperial Crypt next to her brother Charles.

Ancestors

References

 Cécile Douxchamps-Lefevre : Marie-Élisabeth. In: Nouvelle Biographie nationale de Belgique, Bd. 2 (1990), S. 267–270.

External links

1680 births
1741 deaths
17th-century Austrian women
18th-century Austrian women
18th-century House of Habsburg
Governors of the Habsburg Netherlands
Austrian princesses
People from Linz
Nobility of the Austrian Netherlands
Burials at the Imperial Crypt
Burials at St. Stephen's Cathedral, Vienna
18th-century women rulers
Politicians of the Austrian Netherlands
Daughters of emperors
Women of the Austrian Netherlands
Children of Leopold I, Holy Roman Emperor
Daughters of kings
Female governors-general